Michael Brecker is the debut album by American saxophonist Michael Brecker.  It was released on the Impulse! record label in 1987.

Review
The Allmusic review by Scott Yanow awards the album a full 5 stars and states "Although he had been a major tenor saxophonist in the studios for nearly 20 years and was quite popular for his work with the Brecker Brothers, this MCA/Impulse set was Michael Brecker's first as a leader." The album was issued in two versions: LP record and CD. The CD version has a bonus track, "My One and Only Love".

Track listing

Personnel 
 Michael Brecker – tenor saxophone, EWI
 Pat Metheny – guitar
 Kenny Kirkland – keyboards
 Charlie Haden – double bass
 Jack DeJohnette – drums

References 

1987 debut albums
Michael Brecker albums
Impulse! Records albums